The Soviet Union's 1964 nuclear test series was a group of 9 nuclear tests conducted in 1964. These tests followed the 1962 Soviet nuclear tests series and preceded the 1965 Soviet nuclear tests series.

References

1964
1964 in the Soviet Union
1964 in military history
Explosions in 1964